Rebecca Lilith Bathory, previously briefly known as Rebecca Litchfield, is a British photographer, living in London. Her photographic series include Soviet Ghosts, Return to Fukushima. Dark Tourism and Orphans of Time.

Early life and education
Bathory was born in Sutton, London. She graduated from University for the Creative Arts with a first class degree in Graphic Design in June 2006. Between 2008 and 2010 she studied for a master's degree in Fashion Photography at The London College of Fashion, for which she was awarded a distinction. She exhibited her final masters project, Edenias, at Mall Gallery in London.

In 2014, she was awarded a Techne scholarship for a research PhD degree at the University of Roehampton to research the photography of dark tourism photography.  She gained a PhD in Social Anthropology July 2022.

Photography
As Rebecca Litchfield, she recorded many abandoned locations within 10 countries of the former Soviet Union, including towns, factories, prisons, schools, monuments, hospitals, theatres, military complexes, asylums and death camps. Bathory's examines a society shrouded by the cold war.

Bathory's second book explores the nuclear meltdown in Fukushima. Photographed within the thirty mile exclusion zone, 2016 was the first time that residents of the town of Tomioka were given permission to return to their homes; Bathory was also given permission to photograph in the exclusion zone. Undertaking an emotional and thought provoking journey to Fukushima. Bathory presents never-before-seen images which provide a unique and moving meditation on human failure seen through the lens of an accomplished artist. Bathory’s images take you behind the scenes of the ghost town that is Fukushima, at turns heartbreaking and devastating. These photographs ask the question - what next for a nuclear future? . 

In 2016 Bathory photographed her third book Dark Tourism, she travelled around the world to 20 countries to visit 100 dark tourist sites in the UK, Germany, Austria, Czech Republic, Switzerland, France, Italy, Mexico, Vietnam, Cambodia, Thailand, Philippines, Japan, Poland, Slovakia, India, USA, Indonesia, Ukraine and Cuba, to explore interesting historical areas of these dark parts of our history.

The phrase dark tourism conjures up images and ideas of destinations associated with death, suffering, tragedy and the macabre. This kind of dark tourism is a niche for individuals and groups of like minded people that travel to the same destination for a similar experience, generally recording and taking home images of the unusual places that they visit as souvenirs, a holiday snap with a difference, whether it be dark destinations such as Auschwitz or Chernobyl, or local ossuaries and cemeteries.

Photography is an intrusion in the flow of modern society; it fixes and frames and places our view of the world into a different format. Dark tourism is a very visual practice, as is tourism in general; you are not only going to experience the location, but to see it with your own eyes and in most cases photograph it to prolong the moment. In the case of dark tourists taking these still life ‘dark snaps’, the photography captures some of the images, ideologies and horrors which some would prefer to be lost forever.

Bathory's fourth book Orphans of Time, self-published, contains 200 colour photos of abandoned buildings. Since 2012 she travelled around the world for five years, seeking out beautiful locations featuring decay.

Publications

Awards
 2009: Professional Photographer of the Year 2009 Overall Winner, Professional Photographer magazine
 2009: Fashion category winner, Professional Photographer of The Year 2009, Professional Photographer magazine
 2014: Clapham Art Prize Winner, Clapham Art Prize award

Exhibitions
 2016: Salon Del Mobile Milan Presentation, Salon Del Mobile, Milan. For Moooi.

References

External links
 

Photographers from London
Living people
English women photographers
Alumni of the London College of Fashion
Year of birth missing (living people)